The Waterhouse Football Club is a football team based in Kingston, that competes in the Jamaica National Premier League.

Their home stadium is Waterhouse Stadium.

History
The club was founded in 1968 as Harlem Kickers FC, changed to The Great West Football Club in 1972 until it was renamed Waterhouse in 1979 and started with their home ground at Emmett Park. Their home ground has since been moved into the community, The Waterhouse Stadium, which can hold a capacity of up to 5,000.

They won the league title in 2005–06, which was said to be dedicated to the late Peter Cargill, their coach who died in a car crash.

Players

Current squad

Other players under contract

Achievements
Jamaica National Premier League: 2
1998, 2006

JFF Champions Cup: 3
2004, 2008, 2013.

List of coaches
 Peter Cargill † (2004–05)
 Anthony Patrick

References

External links
 Team profile at Golocaljamaica

Football clubs in Jamaica
Association football clubs established in 1968
Sport in Kingston, Jamaica
1968 establishments in Jamaica